Mezhdusharsky Island is the third largest island of the Novaya Zemlya archipelago, lying north of Russia's mainland. It lies in the Barents Sea to the west of the much larger Yuzhny Island.

See also
 List of islands of Russia

References

Islands of Novaya Zemlya
Islands of the Barents Sea
Islands of Arkhangelsk Oblast